Negro Run may refer to:

Negro Run (New Jersey), a tributary of Doctors Creek in Monmouth County
Negro Run (Virginia), a tributary of the York River in Orange and Louisa counties
Negro Run (West Virginia), a stream in Wood County